The relations between Turkey and the United Kingdom have a long history. The countries have been at war several times, such as within the First World War. They have also been allied several times, such as in the Crimean War. Both countries currently maintain relations via the British Embassy in Ankara and the Turkish Embassy in London.

Turkey and the United Kingdom maintain very good bilateral relations.
The President of Turkey Cevdet Sunay paid a state visit to the United Kingdom in November 1967.
The President of Turkey Kenan Evren paid a state visit to the United Kingdom in July 1988.
Queen Elizabeth II of the United Kingdom paid state visits to Turkey in October 1971 and May 2008. Britain and Turkey are both members of the G20,
Council of Europe, and NATO. The United Kingdom signed a free trade agreement with Turkey on 29 December 2020.

History

In 1600, an Anglo-Moroccan alliance was formed between England and the Ottoman vassal states of the Barbary Coast. The British defended the Ottoman Empire against Russia before 1914, most famously in the Crimean War of the 1860s.

20th century

Before 1914 Britain was the main defender of the Ottoman Empire, especially against Russian threats. The relationship between Turkey and Britain shifted dramatically as Germany made a better bargain and in 1914 the Porte (Ottoman government) joined in World War I against Britain. The change was apparent when two recently purchased ships of its navy, still manned by their German crews and commanded by their German admiral, carried out the Black Sea Raid, a surprise attack against Russian ports, on 29 October 1914. Russia replied by declaring war on 1 November 1914 and Russia's allies, Britain and France, then declared war on the Ottoman Empire on 5 November 1914. The reasons for the Ottoman action were not immediately clear.

This war lead to the deaths of hundreds of thousands of Ottomans, the Armenian genocide, the dissolution of the empire, and the abolition of the Islamic Caliphate.

1918-1939 

The Ottoman Empire, of which Palestine was a part, broke up shortly after the First World War and was officially dissolved in 1923 by the Treaty of Lausanne. In the early years of the First World War, there were several important Ottoman victories against the British Empire, such as the Gallipoli Campaign and the Siege of Kut. Palestine was previously a part of the Ottoman Empire. Britain had declared its intention to support the creation of a Jewish homeland in the Balfour Declaration, 1917. The British had, in the Hussein-McMahon Correspondence, previously been in discussions with the Hashemite family concerning the concept of an independent Arab state. These discussions remained inconclusive and vague but contained the implied support from Britain of an independent Arab state in exchange for a successful Arab Revolt during World War I. The British, under General Allenby during the Arab Revolt under the guidance of British intelligence officers, the most famous being T. E. Lawrence, contributed to the defeat of the Ottoman forces in 1917 in which British and French forces occupied the Sinai and the majority of Greater Syria. The land was administered by the British for the remainder of the war.

The Battle of Baku, also known as the Liberation of Baku, was a World War I battle that took place between August and September 1918 between the Ottoman-Azerbaijani coalition forces led by Nuri Pasha and the later Soviet forces between Bolshevik and Dashnak Baku, which the British later succeeded –Armenian-Belarusian forces, led by Lionel Dunsterville, saw briefly how Soviet Russia was entering the war again. The battle was waged as a final part of the Caucasus campaign, but as the beginning of the Armenian-Azerbaijani war. On 14 September, the Ottoman forces captured Baku with their coalition forces.

The occupation of Constantinople and İzmir led to the establishment of a Turkish national movement, which won the Turkish War of Independence (1919–23) under the leadership of Mustafa Kemal (later given the surname "Atatürk"). The sultanate was abolished on 1 November 1922, and the last sultan, Mehmed VI (reigned 1918–22), left the country on 17 November 1922. The Republic of Turkey was established in its place on 29 October 1923 in the new capital city of Ankara. The caliphate was abolished on 3 March 1924.

After 1923 Turco–British relations suddenly became friendly, and have lasted so ever since. Potential tensions such as the status of Mosul province and militarisation and access to the Dardanelles and Bosporus, were resolved.

Cyprus dispute

The Ottoman Empire leased the island of Cyprus to the United Kingdom in 1878.  The UK formally annexed Cyprus as a British colony in 1914 at the outset of the Great War. Britain maintained two sovereign military base areas on the island of Cyprus after the country's independence in 1960. In a response to a coup d'état orchestrated by the military junta of Greece to unite the island with mainland Greece, Turkey invaded the island in June 1974. As a result, more than a quarter of the population of Cyprus were expelled from the occupied northern part of the island, where Greek Cypriots constituted 80% of the population. A little over a year later in 1975, there was also a flow of roughly 60,000 Turkish Cypriots from the south to the north after the conflict. The Turkish invasion ended in the partition of Cyprus along the UN-monitored Green Line which still divides Cyprus. In 1983 the Turkish Republic of Northern Cyprus (TRNC) declared independence, although Turkey is the only country which recognises it. The UK is a signatory to the Treaty of Guarantee, together with Greece and Turkey concerning the independence and status of Cyprus.

Trade
The United Kingdom is the second biggest importer of goods from Turkey, after Germany. Turkey exports around 8% of its total goods to the United Kingdom. Annually, around 2.5 million Britons take holidays in Turkey, while 100,000 Turks travel to the UK for business or pleasure. 
Turkey and the UK signed a free trade agreement on 29 December 2020 following the end of Brexit transition period, as the UK became no longer a part of European Union-Turkey Customs Union.

EU membership
The United Kingdom has been the strongest supporter for the Accession of Turkey to the European Union. The EU and Turkey are linked by a Customs Union agreement, which came in force on 31 December 1995. Turkey has been a candidate country to join the European Union since 1999. In 2010, the BBC reported Prime Minister Cameron's 'anger' at slow pace of Turkish EU negotiations. Boris Johnson, Prime Minister of the United Kingdom has historically been a passionate supporter of Turkey's EU aspirations. However, as a supporter of the United Kingdom leaving the European Union, he is arguing for Turkey - as the UK - to be outside the EU. As the fifth and seventeenth largest global economies (by GDP) respectively, the UK and Turkey are also the second and seventh largest European economies.

Military
During Theresa May's visit to Turkey in January 2017, BAE and TAI officials signed an agreement, worth about £100 million, for BAE to provide assistance in developing the TAI TFX aircraft.
February 2021, it has been confirmed to members of the press corps, that high level talks have taken place on the possibility of selling Turkey an aircraft carrier of the UK flat top style. If it would be second hand, or built in Turkey with UK workers and experts, has not been confirmed. The state of Turkey and the United States has not been mentioned; in relation to the "F 35 Lightning" program; their build slot having been vacated as a result of relevant purchase of Russian anti-aircraft missile systems.

Diplomacy

Of the United Kingdom
Ankara (Embassy)
Istanbul (Consulate-General)
Antalya (Consulate)
Izmir (Consulate)

Of the Republic of Turkey
London (Embassy)
 London (Consulate-General)
Edinburgh (Consulate-General)

See also
 Foreign relations of Turkey
 Foreign relations of the United Kingdom
 EU–Turkey relations 
 EU–UK relations
 List of ambassadors of Turkey to the United Kingdom
 List of diplomats of the United Kingdom to the Ottoman Empire (1583-1924)
 List of ambassadors of the United Kingdom to Turkey (1925- )
 Turks in the United Kingdom
 Turks in Europe

References

Further reading
 Barlas, Dilek, and Şuhnaz Yilmaz. "Managing the transition from Pax Britannica to Pax Americana: Turkey’s relations with Britain and the US in a turbulent era (1929–47)." Turkish Studies (2016): 1-25.
 Hale, William M. Turkish foreign policy, 1774-2000 (Taylor & Francis, 2002).
 Jefferson, Margaret M. "Lord Salisbury and the Eastern Question, 1890-1898." Slavonic and East European Review (1960): 44–60, the British defended the Ottoman Empire against Russia before 1914. online
 MacArthur-Seal, Daniel-Joseph. "Turkey and Britain: from enemies to allies, 1914-1939." Middle Eastern Studies (2018) 54#5 pp 737–743.

External links

   Turkish Ministry of Foreign Affairs about relations with the United Kingdom

 
United Kingdom
Bilateral relations of the United Kingdom